Sujatha Sivakumar is an Born: (27 September 1973) Indian actress who has appeared in Tamil films. Sujatha rose to fame with her performance in Ameer's Paruthiveeran (2007), before appearing in several supporting roles as a mother in Tamil cinema.

Career
Sujatha was given a debut by Kamal Haasan for a small role in Virumaandi (2004). Sujatha made a breakthrough with her performance in Ameer's Paruthiveeran (2007), earning the stage name "Paruthiveeran Sujatha" for her subsequent films. Her portrayal of a feisty village woman later won her the Filmfare Award for Best Tamil Supporting Actress and the Vijay Award for Best Supporting Actress for 2007. The film prompted her to receive more offers from film makers and she collaborated with director Pandiraj for Pasanga (2009) and Kedi Billa Killadi Ranga (2013).

She won acclaim for her work in Vijay Milton's Goli Soda (2014), playing a strong widow who works at the market and speaks Madurai slang, acting as the godmother for lead actors. Sujatha fainted unable to sit by the market platform in the rain, during the making of the film, but she subsequently improved, and by the end of the film, the director gave her rave reviews for her co-operation. As of 2015, she has appeared in close to fifty films.

Selected filmography

Television

See also
  Vivek (Actor)
  Naan Than Bala
 Viswasam

References

External links
 

Actresses from Madurai
Indian film actresses
Actresses in Tamil cinema
Living people
21st-century Indian actresses
1973 births